The 2013 Setanta Sports Cup was the eighth staging of the annual all-Ireland football competition. It commenced on 11 February 2013 and ended on 11 May 2013 with the final played at the Tallaght Stadium, Dublin.

Crusaders were the defending champions, after they defeated Derry City 5–4 on penalties in the 2012 final, when the match ended 2–2 after extra time. However, this season they went out 4–1 on aggregate in the quarter-finals to Cork City. Shamrock Rovers were the eventual winners for the second time overall, following a comfortable 7–1 win over Drogheda United in the final. This season's competition was notable for the fact that all four semi-finalists represented the Republic of Ireland. It was also the sixth time in the eight competitions played thus far that the winner had been a League of Ireland club.

Qualifiers
The following clubs qualified to take part in this year's competition. The eight unseeded clubs entered in the first round, while the four seeded clubs entered in the quarter-finals.

Seeded teams
  Crusaders (holders)
  Derry City (2012 FAI Cup winners)
  Linfield (2011–12 IFA Premiership champions and 2011–12 Irish Cup winners)
  Sligo Rovers (2012 League of Ireland Premier Division champions)

Unseeded teams
  Cliftonville
  Coleraine
  Cork City
  Drogheda United
  Glentoran
  Portadown
  St Patrick’s Athletic
  Shamrock Rovers

First round
The first round draw was made on 6 December 2012. Four League of Ireland and four IFA Premiership clubs played each other in the first round over two games with the winners qualifying for the quarter-finals. The first legs were played on 11 February 2013 and the second legs were played on 18 February 2013.

|}

First Leg

Second Leg

Shamrock Rovers won 2−1 on aggregate.

Glentoran won 1−0 on aggregate.

Cork City won 6−2 on aggregate.

Drogheda United won 8−2 on aggregate.

Quarter-finals
The winners of the four first-round games joined the four seeded teams in the quarter-finals. The first legs were played on 26 February and 4 March, while the second legs were played on 4 and 11 March 2013.

|}

First Leg

Second Leg

Cork City won 4−1 on aggregate.

Sligo Rovers won 8−0 on aggregate.

Drogheda United won 3−2 on aggregate.

Shamrock Rovers won 7−2 on aggregate.

Semi-finals
The first legs of the semi-finals will be played on 16 April and the second legs on 22 April.

|}

First Leg

Second Leg

3–3 on aggregate. Shamrock Rovers won on away goals

Drogheda United won 2−1 on aggregate.

Final

References

External links 
 Fixtures and Results

2013
1
2012–13 in Northern Ireland association football